Qadirabad in Iran, may refer to:
 Qadirabad, Fars
 Qadirabad, Iran, in Razavi Khorasan Province
 Qadirabad, Asadabad, Hamadan Province
 Qadirabad, Kabudarahang, Hamadan Province

See also
 Qaderabad (disambiguation)